A joint issue is the release of stamps or postal stationery by two or more countries to commemorate the same topic, event or person. Joint issues typically have the same first day of issue and their design is often similar or identical, except for the identification of country and value.

Continental joint issues 
 Europa postage stamps : Between 1956 and 1973 the postal authorities of several European nations issued stamps with a common design but since 1974 a common topic is used on stamps issued each year. These are not true joint issues, because they do not share the same designs or dates of issue.

An early unrealized trans-Atlantic joint issue 
 1914 peace commemoratives: In 1914, the United Kingdom, the Dominion of Canada and the United States agreed on a plan by which each of the three nations would issue its own series of stamps that year to commemorate the 100 years of Anglo-American peace that had prevailed since the end of the War of 1812.   After the outbreak of World War I later that year, however, the UK and Canada deemed it inappropriate to issue peace stamps and withdrew from the project.  The US had already produced essays for 2¢ and 5¢ stamps but canceled further plans for the designs. (This would not have been a true joint issue because each country would have designed its stamps individually.)

Australia 
The Australia Post has collaborated several times with the postal administration of another country to release a joint issue.

   [top]

Austria 
The Austria Post has collaborated several times with the postal administration of other countries to release joint issues.

   [top]

Belgium 
The Belgium Post has collaborated several times with the postal administration of other countries to release joint issues.

   [top]

Berlin 
Deutsche Bundespost Berlin of West Berlin prior to German reunification in 1990 had released the following joint issues.

   [top]

Brazil 

   [top]

Bulgaria 

Bulgarian Posts of the Republic of Bulgaria have released the following joint issues:

   [top]

Canada 
Canada Post has released the following joint issues. The United States Postal Service has been Canada Post's most prolific philatelic partner.

   [top]

Chile 

   [top]

People's Republic of China 

   [top]

Croatia 

   [top]

Cyprus 
The Cyprus Postal Services of the Republic of Cyprus has released the following joint issues.

   [top]

Czech Republic 
Česká pošta of the Czech Republic has released the following joint issues.

   [top]

Denmark 
Post Danmark  has collaborated a number of times with other postal administration to release joint issues.

   [top]

Ecuador 

   [top]

Estonia 
The Estonian Post Office has collaborated a number of times with other postal administration to release joint issues.

   [top]

Finland 
Posti has collaborated a number of times with other postal administration to release joint issues.

   [top]

France 
The French Post Office has collaborated with the postal administration of other countries to release several joint issues.

   [top]

French Southern and Antarctic Territories 

   [top]

Gambia 

   [top]

German Democratic Republic 
Deutsche Post of the German Democratic Republic prior to German reunification in 1990 had released the following joint issues..

   [top]

Federal Republic of Germany 
Deutsche Post, and its predecessor Deutsche Bundespost prior to German reunification in 1990, collaborates with the postal administrations of other countries to release joint issues on a regular basis.

   [top]

Greece 
Hellenic Post (ELTA) begun releasing joint issues with other countries in 1999.

   [top]

Greenland 
Post Greenland  has collaborated a number of times with other postal administration to release joint issues.

   [top]

Hong Kong 

   [top]

Hungary 
Magyar Posta  has collaborated a number of times with other postal administration to release joint issues.

   [top]

Iceland 
Íslandspóstur has collaborated a number of times with other postal administration to release joint issues.

   [top]

India 
India Post has collaborated a number of times with the postal administration of other countries to release a joint issue. 
India Post has released 32 Joint issues until Mar 2023.  

India Post planned joint issues that did not materialize.

   [top]

Iran 
Iran Post has collaborated a number of times with the postal administration of other countries to release a joint issue.

   [top]

Ireland 
The Irish Post Office has collaborated several times with the postal administration of another country to release a joint issue.

   [top]

Israel 
Israel Post has collaborated a number of times with other postal administration to release a joint issue.

   [top]

Italy 

   [top]

Japan 
Japan Post has collaborated a number of times with the postal administration of other countries to release a joint issue.

   [top]

Latvia 
Latvijas Pasts has collaborated a number of times with other postal administration to release a joint issue.

   [top]

Lithuania 
Lithuania Post has collaborated a number of times with other postal administration to release a joint issue.

   [top]

Malta 
MaltaPost has collaborated a number of times with other postal administration to release a joint issue.

   [top]

Mayotte 

   [top]

Mexico 
Correos de México, the national postal service of Mexico, has collaborated a number of times with the postal administration of other countries to release a joint issue.

   [top]

Monaco 

   [top]

Mongolia 
Mongol Post, the national postal service of Mongolia, has collaborated with some postal administration of other countries to release a joint issue.

   [top]

Nepal 

   [top]

Netherlands 

   [top]

Norway 
Posten Norge  has collaborated a number of times with other postal administration to release joint issues.

   [top]

Pakistan 
Pakistan Post has collaborated with other countries to release several joint issues.

   [top]

Peru
Serpost, the national postal service of Peru, has collaborated with some postal administration of other countries to release a joint issue.

   [top]

Philippines 
Philippine Postal Corporation, the national postal service of the Philippines, has collaborated with some postal administration of other countries to release a joint issue.

   [top]

Poland 

   [top]

Portugal 

   [top]

Romania 

   [top]

Russia 
Russian Post  has collaborated a number of times with other postal administration to release a joint issue.

   [top]

Slovakia 

   [top]

Slovenia 
Pošta Slovenije has collaborated a number of times with other postal administration to release a joint issue.

   [top]

South Africa 
South African Post Office has collaborated with some postal administration of other countries to release a joint issue.

   [top]

South Korea 
Korea Post has collaborated a number of times with the postal administration of other countries to release a joint issue, mainly commemorating diplomatic relations.

   [top]

Spain 

   [top]

Sweden 
Posten AB  has collaborated a number of times with other postal administration to release a joint issue.

   [top]

Thailand 
Thailand Post has collaborated a number of times with other postal administration to release a joint issue.

   [top]

Turkey 

   [top]

United Nations 

   [top]

United States 
The United States Postal Service collaborates with the postal administration of another country to release a joint issue on a sporadic basis. With seven joint issues, Sweden is the most prolific philatelic partner of the United States.

   [top]

Uruguay 

   [top]

Vatican City 

   [top]

slo

See also
 Omnibus issue

References

External links 
 Joint issues at Australian Post Office
 Joint Stamp Issues Society - JSIS

Philatelic terminology